Pseudis platensis is a frog in the family Hylidae.  It is endemic to Bolivia, Paraguay, Argentina, and Brazil.

This frog had been considered a subspecies of Pseudis paradoxa but, after a genetic analysis in 2007, scientists concluded it should be considered a separate species.

References

platensis
Species described in 1961
Frogs of South America